James Boucher (Died 1704) was an English sailor who was one of the last people in England to be hanged, drawn, and quartered.

Biography
Boucher was born in England and served under James II in Ireland during James' final attempts to regain Britain after the glorious revolution. After James was forced to leave Ireland, Boucher went to France some time before 1697 where he lived for several years and supposedly spent time helping Protestant prisoners of the French king.

Owing to a number of plots against the new King William III, it was made law that to return to England from France it was necessary to gain permission from the government in London. However, not having the personal renown to be able to get noticed by the English government, Boucher and his family remained trapped in France. He mentioned his plight to passing soldiers and noblemen from England, several of whom said they would remember him and mention him when they returned to England so that he could return himself. Believing this was enough, Boucher gave these people time to get back to England before he returned some time before 1703.

However, he had not been lucky enough to be remembered and mentioned before parliament, and he was arrested for travelling into England without a license not long after landing at Eastbourne. Travelling without a licence was high treason, and so Boucher was tried at the Queen's Bench in early 1704 where he pleaded guilty. On the 28th of February he was sentenced, to be hanged, drawn and quartered. However while is prison he was reprieved by Queen Anne but died soon afterwards. (Proceedings against James Boucher, Queen Anne Pages 982 onwards.)

References
 The Arraignment, Confession and Condemnation of James Boucher for High Treason, London, 1704
 Proceedings of the House of Lords concerning the Scottish Conspiracy, London, 1704

1704 deaths
Year of birth unknown
English sailors
People executed at Tyburn
Executed English people